Dongguan (usually ; "Eastern Gate", "Eastern Pass") is a common place name in China. It may refer to:
Dongguan (東莞/东莞), a city in Guangdong, China.
Dongguan Church, in Shenyang, Liaoning, China
Dongguan Mosque, in Xining, Qinghai, China
Dongguan Town, Fujian, in Yongchun County, Fujian
Dongguan Bridge, an ancient bridge in Dongguan Town
3476 Dongguan, main-belt asteroid
Dongguan Street (Yangzhou)

See also
 Xiguan, "west gate"
 Beiguan (disambiguation), "north gate"
 Nanguan (disambiguation), "south gate"